Golea is a surname. Notable people with the surname include:

Anatolie Golea (born 1965), Moldovan journalist
Eugenia Golea (born 1971), Romanian artistic gymnast

See also
El Golea Airport, airport in Algeria

Romanian-language surnames